

The Engineering Division TP-1 was a two-seat biplane fighter designed by Alfred V. Verville and Virginius E. Clark at the United States Army Air Corps Engineering Division. A second aircraft was completed as an observation biplane and designated the Engineering Division XCO-5.

Development
The prototype TP-1 was built as the XTP-1 and tested at McCook Field in 1923. A biplane, the upper wing had a smaller span and narrower chord than the lower wing. The XTP-1 was armed with five  machine guns and fitted with a  Liberty 12 engine. A second prototype was completed as an observation/reconnaissance aircraft with the designation XCO-5.

The XCO5 needed a high-lift wing suitable for high-altitude work. New wings were prepared. The aerofoil was Joukowsky StAe-27A, a heavily cambered wingshape with a thick leading edge. The upper and lower wings had a pronounced stagger, with a total wing area of 600 ft2. As well as lining and insulating the cockpit, heat was taken from the engine exhaust. A cover over the top of the cockpit kept the heat in; a clear panel in the cover allowed the pilot to see his instruments.

Operational history
On October 10, 1928, Bill Streett and Albert William Stevens achieved an unofficial altitude record in the XCO-5 for aircraft carrying more than one person: ; less than  short of the official single-person altitude record. With frozen controls, Streett was unable to reduce altitude or to turn off the engine until some 20 minutes later when it ran out of fuel, after which he piloted the fragile experimental biplane down in a gentle glide and made a deadstick landing.

Variants
TP-1
Two-seat pursuit fighter prototype, one built.
XCO-5
Observation variant of the TP-1, one built.

Operators

United States Army Air Corps

Specifications

See also

References

Bibliography

1920s United States fighter aircraft
TP-1
Single-engined tractor aircraft
Biplanes